The Fools Guild is based in California, themed around the medieval and renaissance idea of the court jester. The central activity of the Guild is producing three parties a year in Los Angeles: Halloween, New Year's Eve, and April Fool's Day.

History
The Fools Guild was born in 1979 at the Renaissance Pleasure Faire of Southern California, where the original improvisational team met while performing as jesters, jugglers, pass-the-hat-acts, and mimes. Originally named by former Pleasure Faire entertainment director Peg Long, The Fools Guild was primarily an improvisational troupe performing at the Renaissance Pleasure Faire near San Francisco and other Bay Area venues.

Around 1982, the Fools Guild moved south to Los Angeles where they rented a house at 8228 Fountain in West Hollywood. The house had a giant main room and very high ceilings, and the Fools began to host parties, workshops and other performance-centered events. Very quickly a social club of comedic performers evolved and the house became known as the Guild Hall. The house was originally built specifically for parties by the original house builders the Santleys. The Santleys were Vaudeville artists and original members of the Screen Actors Guild. They were also members of the old Hollywood Comedy performers club "The Masquers". The Masquers included silent Film actors and comedy celebrities and they often met at the old 8228 residence.

At the Guild Hall, the Fools events attracted other artists in Hollywood, creating focal point for the emerging "New Vaudeville" scene in Los Angeles. The parties became more ornate, with elaborate themed decor and costumes, and drew a growing roster of local regulars, including members of the nearby Groundlings Theatre and The Comedy Club.

In 1987, the original Guild Hall at 8228 Fountain was torn down to make room for an apartment building. The Guild continued the parties using rented venues.

Members
Many members are professionals in the entertainment business, while some are amateurs. Most live in the Los Angeles area, with some in the Bay Area California, though membership is not restricted to California residents.

In 2004, The American Society of Cinematographers' Technology Committee and the six-studio industry consortium Digital Cinema Initiatives created the ASC-DCI Standard Evaluation Material (StEM) "Mini Movie" as the official image quality reference used to create the requirements and standards for Digital Cinema (Filmed on the Universal backlot with Allen Daviau as director of photography). Then King of Fools Christina Linhardt (AKA Venus Creamus) was hired as casting director for the project, drawing talent almost entirely from the Guild. The Fools Guild is officially thanked in the credits of the StEM movie.

See also
 Feast of Fools
 Lord of Misrule
 The Masquers Playhouse

References
 Los Angeles Times: Archives - Temporary Paradise 50 Proud Fools Aren't Kidding About Nonsense

External links
 

Culture of Los Angeles
Guilds in the United States